Olmedo is a comune (municipality) in the Province of Sassari in the Italian region of Sardinia, located about  northwest of Cagliari and about  southwest of Sassari.

Olmedo borders the following municipalities: Alghero, Sassari, Uri.

Demographic evolution

References

External links

 www.comune.olmedo.ss.it/

Cities and towns in Sardinia